Under Proof is a 1936 British comedy crime film directed by Roland Gillett and starring Betty Stockfeld, Tyrell Davis and Judy Kelly. The screenplay concerns a man who is threatened into joining a gang of smugglers.

Cast
 Betty Stockfeld ...  Vivian
 Tyrell Davis ...  Dudley
 Judy Kelly ...  Corone
 Guy Middleton ...  Bruce
 Charles Farrell ...  Spike
 Viola Compton ...  Mrs. Richards
 David Horne ...  Dr. Walton
 Edward Ashley ...  Ward Delaney
 Henry B. Longhurst ...  Inspector Holt

References

External links

1936 films
1930s crime comedy films
British crime comedy films
British black-and-white films
1936 comedy films
1930s English-language films
1930s British films